Rubén Rudesindo Alonso Alves (born 1 September 1962) is a former Uruguayan professional football player and currently manager.

Playing career
He won titles with Alianza and Real España, and was the top goalscorer in the First Division in El Salvador and Honduras, for Fuerte San Francisco and Real España in the 1991–1992 season, and 1988–89 season respectively.

Coaching career
His first coaching tenure was with Árabe Marte and Sonsonate in the Second Division, after a successful spell he became coach of his former club Alianza and helped them win the 1998 Apertura title.

After leaving Alianza, he spent time coaching clubs in the Second Division almost promoting three clubs Municipal Limeño, Jocoro F.C. and Mar y Plata FC to the First Division.

He eventually became coach of the newly formed San Salvador, this would be their greatest coaching achievement to date, since it helped the club not only win the club's only title in its history, it also saved them from relegation three times.

After being released from his contract from San Salvador, he first took the reins of First Division side Isidro Metapán and Independiente Nacional 1906, then he managed Second Division sides Fuerte Aguilares and Once Lobos, but he only managed moderate success with these sides.

He rejoined the San Salvador to try to save them from relegation once again, despite saving them from direct relegation, he couldn't save them from a relegation play-off lost to Juventud Independiente.

After the club folded due to financial difficulty, he signed to coach Alba Acajutla, a club based in Sonsonate, and the club his son plays for.

After a string of defeats he was sacked from the club, however he was signed to coach Águila for the rest of the 2010 Clausura season, but after taking them to the grand final, Águila were defeated by Isidro Metapán and his contract was not extended.

He was presented as the new coach for UES for the 2010 Apertura season.

From 2017 is the manager of Sonsonate, fighting to get out the team from relegation.

Honours

Playing

Club
Alianza F.C.
 Primera División
 Champion: 1986–1987

Real C.D. España
 Liga Nacional
 Champion: 1988–1989

Individual
 Alianza F.C. Golden Boot: 1987-1988 (15 goals)
 Golden Boot:

Manager

Club
Alianza F.C.
 Primera División
 Champion: Apertura 1998, Apertura 2015

San Salvador F.C.
 Primera División
 Champion: Clausura 2003
 Runners-up: Apertura 2002

A.D. Isidro Metapán
 Primera División
 Runners-up: Apertura 2005

C.D. Águila
 Primera División
 Runners-up: Clausura 2010

Jocoro F.C.
 Segunda División
 Champion: Clausura 2017

References

External links

1962 births
Living people
Uruguayan footballers
Uruguayan football managers
Alianza F.C. footballers
Real C.D. España players
Aurora F.C. players
Expatriate footballers in El Salvador
Expatriate football managers in El Salvador
Expatriate footballers in Honduras
Expatriate footballers in Guatemala
Liga Nacional de Fútbol Profesional de Honduras players
Municipal Limeño managers
C.D. Águila managers
Association football forwards